Alex da Silva Coelho (born February 4, 1996) is a Brazilian mixed martial artist who competes in the Lightweight division. A professional since 2014, he most notably competed for the Ultimate Fighting Championship (UFC).

Mixed martial arts career

Early career

Silva started his career in mixed martial arts at the age of 18, and won 20 of 21 bouts, mainly competing for Aspera FC, between 2014 and 2019. He had then-teammate and future UFC star Darren Till, as one of his early mentors through his journey fighting in the Regional MMA scene. After amassing a record of 20-1 (which included 20 finishes), he signed his contract with the UFC, and would quit his job as a security guard in Santa Catarina, Brazil.

Ultimate Fighting Championship

Silva made his promotional debut against Alexander Yakovlev as a late replacement for Teemu Packalen on April 20, 2019, at UFC Fight Night 149. He lost the fight via guillotine choke submission in the second round.

Silva faced Kazula Vargas at UFC Fight Night: Shevchenko vs. Carmouche 2 on August 10, 2019. He out grappled Vargas throughout the fight and won it via unanimous decision.

Silva faced Brad Riddell at UFC 253 September 27, 2020.  He lost the fight via unanimous decision.

Silva was expected to face Devonte Smith on February 6, 2021, at UFC Fight Night 184. However, Silva pulled out due to undisclosed reasons. He was replaced by Justin Jaynes.

Silva faced Joe Solecki on June 4, 2022, at UFC Fight Night 207. He lost the fight via majority decision after a point deduction was given to Silva due to repeatedly locking his toes in the fence.

On June 8, 2022, it was confirmed that Silva was no longer on the UFC roster.

Mixed martial arts record

|-
|
|align=center|
|Makkasharip Zaynukov
|
|UAE Warriors 39
|
|align=center|
|align=center|
|Abu Dhabi, United Arab Emirates
|
|-
|Loss
|align=center|21–4
|Joe Solecki
|Decision (majority)
|UFC Fight Night: Volkov vs. Rozenstruik
|
|align=center|3
|align=center|5:00
|Las Vegas, Nevada, United States
|
|-
| Loss
| align=center| 21–3
| Brad Riddell
| Decision (unanimous)
| UFC 253
| 
|align=center|3
|align=center|5:00
| Abu Dhabi, United Arab Emirates
| 
|-
| Win
| align=center| 21–2
| Kazula Vargas
| Decision (unanimous)
|UFC Fight Night: Shevchenko vs. Carmouche 2 
|
|align=center|3
|align=center|5:00
|Montevideo, Uruguay
|
|-
| Loss
| align=center| 20–2
| Alexander Yakovlev
|Submission (guillotine choke)
|UFC Fight Night: Overeem vs. Oleinik 
|
|align=center|2
|align=center|3:10
|Saint Petersburg, Russia
|
|-
| Win
| align=center| 20–1
| Slavoljub Mitić
| TKO (doctor stoppage)
| Serbian Battle Championship 19
| 
| align=center| 1
| align=center| 1:11
| Novi Sad, Serbia
|
|-
| Win
| align=center|19–1
| Fernando Colman
| Submission (guillotine choke)
| Aspera FC 57
| 
| align=center|1
| align=center|2:49
| Florianópolis, Brazil
|
|-
| Loss
| align=center|18–1
| Jakub Kowalewicz
| Decision (unanimous)
| Brave CF 5
| 
| align=center|3
| align=center|5:00
| Mumbai, India
|
|-
| Win
| align=center|18–0
| Daniel Swain
| TKO (punches)
|Brave CF 2
| 
| align=center|2
| align=center|4:37
| Isa Town, Bahrain
|
|-
| Win
| align=center|17–0
| Marcelo Rodrigues Piazza Santos
| TKO (punches)
| Aspera FC 41
| 
| align=center|2
| align=center|1:00
| São José, Brazil
|
|-
| Win
| align=center| 16–0
| Welinton Dias
| KO (punch)
| Aspera FC 33
| 
| align=center|1
| align=center|1:07
| São José, Brazil
| 
|-
| Win
| align=center| 15–0
| Wesley dos Santos
| TKO (punches)
| K.O. Combate 2
|
|align=Center|1
|align=center|4:51
|Caçador, Brazil
| 
|-
| Win
| align=center| 14–0
| Guilherme Batista
| TKO (punches)
|Blasius Combat 2
|
|align=center|1 
|align=center|1:17
|São Ludgero, Brazil
|
|-
| Win
| align=center| 13–0
| Gabriel Vieira das Neves
|TKO (elbows)
|Aspera FC 25 
|
|align=center|1
|align=center|2:48
|Curitibanos, Brazil
|
|-
| Win
| align=center| 12–0
| Silvio Fernandes
| KO (knee)
| Aspera FC 22
| 
| align=center| 1
| align=center| 0:44
| Cocal do Sul, Brazil
|
|-
| Win
| align=center|11–0
| Luis Fernando Messa
| TKO (elbows)
| Aspera FC 21
| 
| align=center|1
| align=center|4:26
| São Paulo, Brazil
|
|-
| Win
| align=center|10–0
| Mateus Santana Dias
| KO (punch)
| Fox Fight 1
| 
| align=center|1
| align=center|1:55
| Joaçaba, Brazil
|
|-
| Win
| align=center|9–0
| Marcelo Boldrini
| TKO (punches)
| Aspera FC 17
| 
| align=center|1
| align=center|4:07
| Curitibanos, Brazil
|
|-
| Win
| align=center|8–0
| Fernando Scariot
| Submission (rear-naked choke)
| Aspera FC 14
| 
| align=center|2
| align=center|2:56
|Lages, Brazil
|
|-
| Win
| align=center| 7–0
| Antônio Marcos Pereira
| Submission (rear-naked choke)
| Aspera FC 11
| 
| align=center|1
| align=center|3:12
| Curitibanos, Brazil
| 
|-
| Win
| align=center| 6–0
| Celso Ferreira
| Submission (rear-naked choke)
| Curitiba Fight Pro 2
|
|align=Center|1
|align=center|4:50
|Curitiba, Brazil
| 
|-
| Win
| align=center| 5–0
| Herison Oliveira
| TKO (punches)
| Aspera FC 8
| 
| align=center| 1
| align=center| 1:16
| Paranaguá, Brazil
|
|-
| Win
| align=center| 4–0
| Jeferson Lins
| Submission (rear-naked choke)
| Aspera FC 7
| 
| align=center| 1
| align=center| 3:20
| Itajaí, Brazil
|
|-
| Win
| align=center| 3–0
| Guilherme Souza
| TKO (doctor stoppage)
| Curitiba Fight Pro
| 
| align=center| 1
| align=center| N/A
| Xaxim, Brazil
| 
|-
| Win
| align=center| 2–0
| Douglas Carvalho
| Submission (triangle choke)
| Aspera FC 3
| 
| align=center| 1
| align=center| 4:16
| Itajaí, Brazil
|
|-
| Win
| align=center| 1–0
| Igor Duarte
| KO (head kick)
| Aspera FC 2
| 
| align=center| 1
| align=center| 2:20
| Itajaí, Brazil
|

See also 
 List of male mixed martial artists

References

External links 
  
 

1996 births
Living people
Brazilian male mixed martial artists
Lightweight mixed martial artists
Ultimate Fighting Championship male fighters